Joseba Arriaga Dosantos (born 28 July 1982) is a Spanish retired footballer who played as a forward.

Formed at Athletic Bilbao, he spent most of his 18-year senior career in Segunda División B, representing a host of clubs. His professional input consisted of 56 La Liga matches (three goals), and 83 appearances in Segunda División for four teams.

Club career
Born in Ermua, Biscay, Arriaga emerged through Athletic Bilbao's youth system at Lezama, and was promoted to the first team for the 2002–03 season. He made his debut in a friendly against farm team CD Basconia on 26 July 2002, coming on as a substitute for Julen Guerrero. He first appeared in La Liga roughly one month later, playing the full 90 minutes against Real Sociedad in a local derby (4–2 away loss).

Arriaga's importance would drastically diminish the following campaign, being only third or fourth-choice, and eventually had to resume his career in the second division, with SD Eibar and UD Las Palmas. After that, he had two steady years with Real Jaén – but in the third tier.

After a good second year, Arriaga stayed in Andalusia but moved to Cádiz CF, recently returned to division two. He was loaned to Deportivo Alavés one league below in the 2010 winter transfer window after receiving very few opportunities, and alternated between the second and third divisions of Spanish football the following years, with AD Ceuta, CD Guadalajara and Gimnàstic de Tarragona.

Arriaga was released by Catalonia's Gimnàstic in late December 2012. In mid-January 2013 he returned to his native region, signing for lowly Barakaldo CF.

On 22 May 2014, Arriaga moved to neighbouring SD Amorebieta also in the third tier. Four years later, after another spell with that club and also Real Unión, the 36-year-old announced his retirement.

References

External links

Stats and bio at Cadistas1910 

1982 births
Living people
People from Ermua
Sportspeople from Biscay
Spanish footballers
Footballers from the Basque Country (autonomous community)
Association football forwards
La Liga players
Segunda División players
Segunda División B players
Tercera División players
CD Basconia footballers
Bilbao Athletic footballers
Athletic Bilbao footballers
SD Eibar footballers
UD Las Palmas players
Real Jaén footballers
Cádiz CF players
Deportivo Alavés players
AD Ceuta footballers
CD Guadalajara (Spain) footballers
Gimnàstic de Tarragona footballers
Barakaldo CF footballers
SD Amorebieta footballers
Real Unión footballers
Spain under-21 international footballers